The Dolná Blava is a right tributary of the Dolný Dudváh in Trnava District, Western Slovakia. It flows into the Dolný Dudváh near Križovany nad Dudváhom.

References

Rivers of Slovakia